Kyriaki Kynossidou (born 31 August 1988) is a Greek footballer who plays as a defender for Cypriot First Division club Apollon Ladies FC and the Greece women's national team.

References

1988 births
Living people
Women's association football defenders
Greek women's footballers
Greece women's international footballers
PAOK FC (women) players
Apollon Ladies F.C. players
Greek expatriate women's footballers
Greek expatriate sportspeople in Cyprus
Expatriate women's footballers in Cyprus
21st-century Greek women